Taraneh Boroumand is an Iranian playwright, writer, poet, and translator. She is the author of a collection of short stories, a book of poetry, and three plays. She is best known for her theatrical debut Gereh-i dar Tār-o-Pūd-e Naqš ("A Knot in the Warp and Weft of a Design"), a play about a journey and decision through which one character ultimately finds herself and another loses himself. It made its debut at the 27th Fajr International Theater Festival in 2007 where it was selected as the Year’s Top Drama. The play went on to a successful run across Iran and neighboring countries.

Early life
She was born in Tehran to a literary family. Her father was a librarian and historian. Her uncle Adib Boroumand was an Iranian poet, politician, lawyer, head of the Leadership Council, and Chairman of Central Council of the National Front of Iran.

Bibliography
Plays
 2007: A Knot in the Warp and Weft of a Design ("Gereh-i dar Tar-o-pood-e Yek Naghsh"), Namayesh Publication; 
 2012: Swamp Lily ("Niloofar-e Mordab"), Afraz Publication;  
 2013: Her Life ("Zendegi-e Ou"), Ava-ye Kelar Publication; 
Poetry
 2014: Pareha-ye Yad-e To, Negah Publication;  
Short Stories
2011: The Enchantment of a Portrait; ; 
Translations
2010: Natasha”, by Vladimir Nabokov, Nila Publication; 
2010: Fear Street, by R. L. Stine, Vida Publication; 
2011: The Table by the Window, by Terence Rattigan, Nila Publication; 
2011: Table Number Seven'', by Terence Rattigan, Nila Publication;

References 

Writers from Tehran